Constantin Pistol (born 12 June 1967) is a Romanian former footballer who played for Steaua București and was part of their team that won the European Cup in the 1985–86 season, appearing in only one game when he was sent to replace Gabi Balint for the last 7 minutes of the first leg of the semi-final against Anderlecht. He has a total of 146 Divizia A appearances in which he scored 19 goals and 4 matches played in European competitions.

On 25 March 2008 he was decorated by the president of Romania, Traian Băsescu with Ordinul "Meritul Sportiv" – (The Order "The Sportive Merit") class II for his part in winning the 1986 European Cup Final.

Honours
Steaua București
Divizia A: 1985–86
European Cup: 1985–86

References

1967 births
Living people
Romanian footballers
Association football midfielders
Romania under-21 international footballers
FC Steaua București players
FC Rapid București players
FC Olt Scornicești players
FC Progresul București players
Liga I players
Sportspeople from Sibiu